Habenaria nigrescens is a species of plant in the family Orchidaceae. It is found in Cameroon and Nigeria. Its natural habitat is subtropical or tropical high-altitude grassland. It is threatened by habitat loss.

References

nigrescens
Vulnerable plants
Orchids of Cameroon
Orchids of Nigeria
Taxonomy articles created by Polbot